Sarmizegetusa (colloquially and until 1941 officially Grădiște;) is a commune in Țara Hațegului depression, Hunedoara County, Transylvania, Romania. It is composed of five villages: Breazova (Brázova), Hobița-Grădiște (Hobicavárhely), Păucinești (Paucsinesd), Sarmizegetusa and Zeicani (Zajkány).

Built atop the ruins of the capital of Roman Dacia, Ulpia Traiana Sarmizegetusa, it is some 40 km from the capital of the Dacian kingdom, Sarmizegetusa Regia. The ruins of both Ulpia Traiana Sarmizegetusa and Sarmizegetusa Regia are still available for visiting.

References

Communes in Hunedoara County
Localities in Transylvania
Țara Hațegului